Jaime Rolando Saquipay Pañi (born 21 July 1979 in Baños, Azuay) is a male race walker from Ecuador.

Personal bests

Track walk
10,000 m: 41:00.9 min (ht) –  Quito, 16 May 2009
20,000 m: 1:22:55.4 hrs (ht) –  Cali, 22 July 2005

Road walk
10 km: 41:51 min –  Loja, 12 March 2006
20 km: 1:19:21 hrs –  Lima, 7 May 2005
35 km: 2:43:48 hrs –  Portoviejo, 13 February 2011
50 km: 3:50:19 hrs –  Taicang, 3 May 2014

Achievements

References

External links

Sports-Reference

1979 births
Living people
Ecuadorian male racewalkers
Athletes (track and field) at the 2004 Summer Olympics
Athletes (track and field) at the 2008 Summer Olympics
Athletes (track and field) at the 2016 Summer Olympics
Athletes (track and field) at the 2007 Pan American Games
Athletes (track and field) at the 2011 Pan American Games
Olympic athletes of Ecuador
Pan American Games medalists in athletics (track and field)
Pan American Games silver medalists for Ecuador
Medalists at the 2007 Pan American Games
21st-century Ecuadorian people